Ryan James Thomas (born 10 June 1984) is an English former actor. He is known for playing the role of Jason Grimshaw on ITV soap opera Coronation Street from 2000 until 2016. In 2018, he played Rafael Humphreys in Australian soap opera Neighbours, and won the twenty-second and final series of Celebrity Big Brother.

In March 2021, Thomas announced he was quitting acting, after having "really lost the bug for it".

Career 
Thomas was 16 when he made his on-screen debut as Jason Grimshaw in Coronation Street on 25 December 2000. In 2012, Thomas took part in a documentary called Corrie Goes to Kenya, along with his co-stars Brooke Vincent (Sophie Webster), Sue Cleaver (who plays his on-screen mother Eileen Grimshaw) and Ben Price (Nick Tilsley). Thomas said that his time in Kenya changed him as a person and made him realise how much he has in life.

Thomas left Coronation Street in June 2016, after nearly sixteen years in the role. He told Daniel Kilkelly of Digital Spy that he wanted "a different experience" and the chance to pursue other roles. His co-star Terence Maynard, who played his on-screen father Tony Stewart, was also a big factor in his decision to leave the soap. He added "It could be stage, it could be TV, or I could disappear and start learning my craft – start from the bottom and do some acting classes again. These are all things that I need to do because I feel like I haven't done them yet."

He made his panto debut in late-2016 as Prince Charming in the Wyvern Theatre production of Cinderella. The following year, he starred as Captain Hook in Peter Pan at Venue Cymru. In 2018, he played the role at the Beck Theatre, Hayes. In 2019 he starred in the role of Dick Whittington at the Grand Theatre in Wolverhampton.

Thomas joined the cast of Australian television soap opera Neighbours in October 2017 as Rafael Humphreys. He made his on-screen debut during the 60-minute "Hit & Run" special on 12 February 2018.

In August 2018, Thomas took part in the 22nd series of Celebrity Big Brother. During the episode broadcast on 30 August, Thomas was seen play fighting with actress Roxanne Pallett. Pallett then accused him of intentionally punching her, video footage failed to show Thomas had made physical any contact, apart from a brush with his ring finger. Big Brother issued Thomas with a warning, leading viewers to make 11,420 complaints to Ofcom about the incident. Pallett has since apologised to Thomas for what she has described as "an overreaction to what wasn't a malicious act". On 10 September 2018, Thomas was announced as the winner of the series.

Thomas appeared as a contestant in Celebrity Masterchef in 2022. In December 2022, Thomas participated in Celebrity Antiques Road Trip S.11 Ep.20, winning against Kimberley Walsh.

Personal life 
Thomas is the brother of former Waterloo Road and Emmerdale actor, Adam Thomas, and Love Island personality, Scott Thomas.

He is of English, Indian and Caribbean ancestry. His paternal grandfather is from Mumbai, India, and emigrated to Manchester, England, in 1947. His paternal great-grandmother was a West Indian who had Caribbean ancestry.

In 2013, he filed for bankruptcy following an unpaid tax bill of £40,000. Thomas was arrested in 2015 for being drunk and disorderly in a Lake District nightclub. He was fined £90.

Thomas dated his Coronation Street co-star Tina O'Brien from 2003 until 2009. They have a daughter together. Thomas has been in a relationship with Lucy Mecklenburgh since 2017. They met while taking part in Celebrity Island with Bear Grylls. He became engaged to Mecklenburgh in June 2019. They have two children together.

Filmography

Television

Awards and nominations

See also
 List of Celebrity Big Brother (British TV series) housemates

References

External links 
 

1984 births
Living people
Male actors from Salford
English male soap opera actors
English expatriates in Australia
English people of Barbadian descent
English people of Indian descent
21st-century English male actors